Taurochenodeoxycholic acid is a bile acid formed in the liver of most species, including humans, by conjugation of chenodeoxycholic acid with taurine. It is secreted into bile and then into intestine. It is usually ionized at physiologic pH, although it can be crystallized as the sodium salt.

It acts as detergent to solubilize fats in the small intestine and is itself absorbed by active transport in the terminal ileum.

It is used as a cholagogue and choleretic.

See also
 Tauroursodeoxycholic acid, an epimer
 See article about Taurodeoxycholic acid as an interferent in Perfluorooctanesulfonic acid (PFOS) mass spectrometry analysis.

References

Bile acids
Sulfonic acids
Carboxamides
Diols
Cholanes